Sang is the pinyin romanization of the Chinese surname  (Sāng). Both forms were unlisted among the Song-era Hundred Family Surnames.

Distribution
Sang was unlisted among the 100-most-common surnames in mainland China in 2007 or on Taiwan in 2005. It was the 16,712nd most common name in United States during the 2000 US Census.

History
Sang literally means "mulberry". Its Old Chinese form has been reconstructed as *sˤaŋ, but it was already Sang by the time of Middle Chinese.

List of persons with the surname

Sang Guowei (b. 1941), Chinese politician
Sang Hongyang (c. 152–80 BC), Han-era official
Sang Lan (b. 1981), Chinese gymnast and television personality
Samantha Sang (b. 1951), the stage name of the Chinese-Australian singer Cheryl Lau Sang
Stephanie Sang Xu (b. 1986), Chinese-Australian table tennis player
Sang Xue (b. 1984), Chinese diver
Sang Yang (b. 1982), Chinese badminton player

Tom Sang (b. 1999), football player from Liverpool, England

References

Chinese-language surnames
Individual Chinese surnames